Edward Theodore Riley (born October 8, 1967) is an American singer, songwriter, and record producer credited with the creation of the New Jack Swing genre. Riley credits Barry Michael Cooper with giving the genre its name.

He fused hip hop and R&B in his production work with artists including Michael Jackson, Bobby Brown, Keith Sweat, Samantha Mumba, Doug E. Fresh, Today, Heavy D & the Boyz, Hi-Five, Men of Vizion and Profyle, as well as his spearheaded groups Guy and Blackstreet. Riley's consistency and drum ideas had some influence on modern-day R&B, leading to more samples and rapping segments as well as singing, a practice which in part was reminiscent of the Jackson family. Along with neo soul-style singers such as Marvin Gaye, Riley has had a seminal influence on gospel and R&B music, which became more open to using rap and sound effects in their recordings.

Early life
Teddy Riley was raised in St. Nicholas Houses in Harlem, New York City. A child prodigy from the age of five, he began playing instruments in church. His uncle, who owned the famed Harlem club The Rooftop, built a studio in the club in which Riley would spend most of his time while growing up. By 14, upstate  New York rappers began making music to his tracks. Under the guidance of local music producer Gene Griffin, Riley formed the short-lived group Kids at Work. At the age of 18, Riley produced Kool Moe Dee's 12" single Go See the Doctor. Released on an independent label in 1986, the song became a crossover hit, reaching No.89 on the Billboard Hot 100. Riley had previously worked on the production of Doug E. Fresh and the Get Fresh Crew's "The Show" in 1985.

Career
In 1987, Riley, Aaron Hall, and Timmy Gatling formed the R&B group Guy. Managed by Gene Griffin, Riley's work with Guy pioneered the "new jack swing" style of R&B. Riley infused his own blend of hip-hop beats, R&B progressions and the gospel vocal stylings of Hall to create the archetypal new jack swing sound on Guy's eponymous debut. In 1989, Riley produced Big Daddy Kane's "I Get the Job Done", as well as other work for the Jacksons, the Winans and James Ingram. In that year, he helped produce the debut album of his rap-band, Wrecks-N-Effect. He also created the highly successful remix of Jane Child's "Don't Wanna Fall in Love", which became a crossover pop smash.

After the release and tour of Guy's second album, The Future, Riley co-produced half of Michael Jackson's Dangerous album on the recommendation of Jackson's long-time producer Quincy Jones. After the disbandment of Guy in 1992, Riley moved to production, performance on and promotion of Wreckx-N-Effect's second album Hard or Smooth. 

In late 1991, Riley formed a second group, Blackstreet. The group would go on to release several major hits, including "Don't Leave Me" (1997), the number one single "No Diggity" (1996, featuring Dr. Dre and Queen Pen), and "Girlfriend/Boyfriend" (1999, with Janet Jackson, Eve, and Ja Rule). By 2011, the group had disbanded and reformed several times.

In 2000, Riley worked with Spice Girl Melanie B on the tracks "ABC 123", "I Believe", and "Pack Your S**t" for her solo debut album Hot. He also worked on an album with Outsiderz 4 Life, producing "Wil' Out" and other songs.

At the start of 2006, he was part of the New Jack Reunion Tour, featuring Blackstreet and Guy, in addition to After 7, SWV, and Tony Toni Toné. In May 2006, Riley announced that he would be working on two key projects: a new Blackstreet album and a new Guy album.

In 2008, Riley was the victim of a Ponzi scheme that left him bankrupt. In June 2008, a fire destroyed Riley's Virginia Beach recording studio. Fire investigators said that an electrical problem caused the blaze that burned the abandoned recording studio. The Virginia Beach Fire Department said lightning in the area also could have been a factor, although there was no direct
strike.  The empty studio was for sale and was insured for $336,000.

In 2009, Riley performed with Guy at the BET Awards. In the same year, Riley worked with Amerie and Robin Thicke on their respective albums. Leading on from his work on Snoop Dogg's album Ego Trippin', Riley became part of the production supergroup QDT, which features DJ Quik as well as Snoop Dogg.

Riley produced and co-wrote the song "Teeth" with Lady Gaga for her EP The Fame Monster. Speaking in March 2010 to Blues & Soul's Pete Lewis – Riley said that he was no longer affiliated with Guy (Riley had last performed with the group in October 2010). Riley also said that the current line-up of Blackstreet consisted of himself, Chauncey Hannibal, Dave Hollister and Sherman 'J-Stylz' Tisdale.  He confirmed that he was working on a new Blackstreet album, though intended to release his own album – entitled 'TRX' – first. Artists he could possibly be working with for the project included Stevie Wonder and Elton John, plus his own new, upcoming acts. However, Hannibal stopped performing with the group and the lineup became Riley, Hollister, Mark Middleton and Eric Williams. In 2012, Hannibal returned to Blackstreet. Middleton and Williams left the group. As of 2019, the group's lineup now consists of Riley, Dave Hollister, J-Stylz, and Rodney Poe under the name "Blackstreet 2".

In an August 2010, co-executor of the Michael Jackson estate, John Branca, confirmed that a posthumous album of Michael Jackson would be released, containing work done in the previous five years with producers Neff-U, Christopher "Tricky" Stewart and Riley, as well as work written and produced solely by Jackson himself. The album Michael was released on December 14, 2010, in the United States. After the release, several people questioned some of the music Riley produced for the project. Riley insisted all of the songs were sung by Jackson and claimed that vocal artifacts were added from overprocessing Jackson's voice. However, Riley made comments in an interview with Dan Dodds (aka Soul Jones) in which he stated that there were some elements of his voice in the music. "They may use some elements from me, put together ideas but I haven't been working on the new album" Riley is reported to have said.

Recently, Riley has stepped into the Korean music market. Riley worked with singer/rapper Jay Park on an English track titled "Demon", which was originally meant for Michael Jackson. Riley produced a mini album for the Korean girl group Rania.

Riley is one of the producers part of the production team QDT, with DJ Quik and Snoop Dogg. He produced the tracks "Believe" and "Flow" for the Twenty album of the R&B group Boyz II Men. He has also produced Korean girl group Girls' Generation's single "The Boys" for the group's first international release. He has also produced songs for Girls' Generation's labelmates SHINee and EXO.  He worked with Shinee on "Beautiful", "Shine", and "Dangerous" from their two part third Korean studio album. Riley also produced the songs "MILK" and "All Night" for f(x)'s third studio album Red Light and the song "What Is Love" for Exo.

Discography

With Kids at Work
 Kids at Work (1984)

With Guy
 Guy (1988)
 The Future (1990) 
 Guy III (2000)

With Blackstreet
 Blackstreet (1994) 
 Another Level (1996) 
 Finally (1999) 
 Level II (2003)

Production discography

Singles

Production credits

References

1967 births
Living people
African-American record producers
Record producers from New York (state)
African-American  male singer-songwriters
American hip hop musicians
American soul singers
American dance musicians
Blackstreet members
American hip hop singers
Grammy Award winners
New jack swing musicians
People from Harlem
Singers from New York City
American contemporary R&B singers
Record producers from Virginia
People from Virginia Beach, Virginia
21st-century African-American male singers
20th-century African-American male singers
Singer-songwriters from New York (state)